Duping is a town of Fengkai County in western Guangdong province, China, near the border with Guangxi to the west. , It has 1 residential community and 7 villages under its administration.

References 

Towns in Guangdong
Zhaoqing